Polhillia ignota is a species of flowering plant in the genus Polhillia. Prior to its rediscovery in September 2016, it was known from two specimens, and declared extinct in 2014. It is endemic to Eendekuil, in the Western Cape.

Distribution 
Polhillia ignota is found from northern Swartland, between Vredenburg, Eendekuil and Porterville.

Description 
Polhillia ignota is a large, rounded shrub, up to 1 m in height. Its inflorescences are yellow.

Conservation status 
Polhillia ignota is classified as Critically Endangered as it occurs in critically endangered Swartland Shale Renosterveld, of which only 10% remain. The population is expected to continue to decline due to ongoing threats of habitat degradation and competition from alien invasive plants.

References

External links 
 
 

Endemic flora of South Africa
Flora of South Africa
Flora of the Cape Provinces
Genisteae